Common name: quill-snouted snakes.
Xenocalamus is a genus of rear-fanged venomous snakes in the family Atractaspididae. The genus is endemic to Africa. Five species are recognized as being valid.

Description (diagnosis) of genus
Snakes of the genus Xenocalamus exhibit the following characters:

Maxillary very short, with five teeth gradually increasing in size and followed, after an interspace, by two large grooved fangs situated below the eye. Anterior mandibular teeth slightly larger than the posterior ones. Palate toothless.

Head small, not distinct from neck. Snout pointed, very prominent, very flattened. Rostral very large with obtuse horizontal edge, flat below. Eye minute, with round pupil. Nostril between two nasals, the posterior nasal very large. No loreal. Prefrontals absent (fused with the frontal). No anterior temporal.

Body cylindrical; tail very short, obtuse.

Dorsal scales smooth, without apical pits, arranged in 17 rows. Ventrals rounded; subcaudals in two rows.

Species

*) Not including the nominate subspecies.

See also
Snakebite.

References

Further reading
Günther A (1868). "Sixth Account of new Species of Snakes in the Collection of the British Museum". Ann. Mag. Nat. Hist., Fourth Series 1: 413–429. (Xenocalamus, new genus, p. 414).

Atractaspididae
Snake genera
Taxa named by Albert Günther
Taxonomy articles created by Polbot